Adolf Markovich Petrovsky (1887, in Warsaw, Vistula Land, Russian Empire – 17 September 1937 in Soviet Union) was a Soviet diplomat.

Career 
From 10 December 1924 until 31 January 1930, Petrovsky was the Plenipotentiary Representative of the Soviet Union in Estonia. From 31 January 1930 to 21 December 1930, he was the Plenipotentiary Representative of the USSR in Lithuania. From 21 December 1930 until 1 April 1933, he was the Plenipotentiary Representative of the USSR in Persia.

From 1 April 1933 until 10 November 1935, he was the Plenipotentiary Representative of the Soviet Union in Austria, with concurrent accreditation as the Plenipotentiary Representative of the USSR in Hungary.

Petrovsky was arrested during Joseph Stalin's Great Purge in 1937.

References 

1887 births
1937 deaths
Diplomats from Warsaw
People from Warsaw Governorate
Social Democracy of the Kingdom of Poland and Lithuania politicians
Communist Party of Poland politicians
Communist Party of the Soviet Union members
Ambassadors of the Soviet Union to Austria
Ambassadors of the Soviet Union to Estonia
Ambassadors of the Soviet Union to Hungary
Ambassadors of the Soviet Union to Iran
Ambassadors of the Soviet Union to Lithuania
Great Purge victims from Poland
Polish emigrants to the Soviet Union